Israeli settlement are Jewish civilian communities built on lands occupied by Israel in the 1967 Six-Day War.

The term Israeli settlement may also refer to:
 A type of settlement specific to Israeli culture:
 Kibbutz, a communal agricultural community.
 Moshav, a joint agricultural community.
 Community settlement (Israel), where homeowners are organized in a cooperative.